Křížek (feminine Křížková) is a Czech surname. Notable people with the surname include:

 Matthias Krizek (born 1988), Austrian cyclist
 Milan Křížek (1926-2018), Czech composer, music teacher and viola player
 Paul Krizek (born 1961), American politician
 Šárka Křížková, Czech badminton player
 Zdeněk Křížek (born 1983), Czech footballer

Czech-language surnames